Anton Malatinský Stadium is a football stadium located in Trnava, Slovakia, which is the home ground of the local football club Spartak Trnava. The stadium was completely renovated in 2013–2015 and has an all-seated capacity of 19,200 which makes it the second-largest football stadium in Slovakia.

On 14 January 1998, the stadium was named in the honour of former footballer and manager Anton Malatinský, who died in 1992.

2013–2015 reconstruction
Stadium underwent a complex reconstruction in 2013–2015. The project consisted not only of complete reconstruction of the stadium, but also building the adjacent shopping centre named City Arena. The whole construction cost of the project is €79 million, out of which €28 million is the cost of stadium reconstruction. Slovak government provided €13 million of the cost.

Spartak Trnava officially announced the intention on 25 November 2011, and after that preparation works began immediately. 
Three out of four stands (including old floodlight) were completely demolished between April and August 2013. Construction permit was granted in August 2013 and cornerstone of the stadium was placed in September 2013. Spartak Trnava continued playing at the stadium even during the reconstruction, with only West stand in service. In May 2015, the last of the four stands was demolished and subsequently rebuilt.

Opening ceremony of the new stadium took place on 22 August 2015. In the opening match, Spartak Trnava lost to Brazilian club Atlético Paranaense 0–2.

Milestone matches (after reconstruction)

International matches
Anton Malatinský Stadium has hosted 34 matches of the Slovakia national team (14 friendlies and 20 competitive games).

Image gallery

External links
Stadium Database Article
Football stadiums profile
Fansite - City Arena Trnava
Videos - Construction of the stadium

References

Antona Malatinskeho
Buildings and structures in Trnava
FC Spartak Trnava
Sports venues completed in 1921
1921 establishments in Slovakia